Peltandra, the arrow arums, is a genus of plants in the family Araceae. It is native to the eastern United States, eastern Canada, and Cuba.

Species
 Peltandra sagittifolia - (Michx.) Morong - Spoon flower or the white arrow arum - southeastern US from eastern Louisiana to Virginia
 Peltandra virginica (L.) Schott - Arum arrow - Cuba, Quebec, Ontario, Oregon, California, Washington; eastern US from Maine to Florida, west to Texas, Kansas, and Minnesota
 †Peltandra primaeva – Eocene, Golden Valley Formation, North Dakota, USA

References

Aroideae
Araceae genera
Flora of North America